is a Japanese freestyle motocross rider who has competed in international events including the X-Games, being the first Japanese medalist in the X-Games. He has three X-Games Gold Medals in Freestyle Moto. The only other rider to win more than three Golds in FMX along with Travis Pastrana. A pioneer for the growth of the sport, he is known for inventing the body varial trick the “California Roll/Cali Roll” or sometimes nicknamed the “Taka Roll” which is a slightly different version of the Special Flip.

Higashino began riding motocross when he was seven, and attended many races during his teens. He turned professional at age 18, and moved to the United States in 2006 to compete. He appeared in his first X Games contest in 2007. His motocross career took off in 2010, when he finished first at the Dew Tour Salt Lake City FMX Contest, Red Bull XRAY, and earned a bronze medal for his FMX Best Trick performance at X Games XVI. That year, Transworld Motocross named Higashino the Breakout FMX Rider of the Year.

In 2011, Higashino took first place at the ASA World Championships of FMX and competed in his fifth consecutive X Games competition. He also performed on the Nuclear Cowboyz Freestyle Chaos tour, an American motocross exhibition, and will ride on the tour again in 2012. At X Games XVIII in 2012, he won gold in Moto X Freestyle and claimed second in Moto X Best Trick.

Career highlights
Winner, 2013 Red Bull X-Fighters Osaka, FMX
Gold, X Games Los Angeles 2013 Moto X Freestyle

Gold, X Games Foz do Iguaçu 2013, Moto X Freestyle
Gold, 2012 X Games Los Angeles 2012, Moto X Freestyle
Winner, 2011 ASA World Championships of FMX
Winner, 2010 Dew Tour Salt Lake City FMX Contest
Winner, 2010 Red Bull XRAY
Silver, 2012 X Games, FMX Best Trick
Bronze, 2010 X Games, FMX Best Trick

References

External links
TAKA FMX (personal blog, in Japanese)

Living people
X Games athletes
Freestyle motocross riders
Japanese motorcycle racers
1985 births
Sportspeople from Osaka